Francis G. Judge (April 4, 1908 – June 27, 1994) was an American electrician, businessman, and politician.

Judge was born in Cannon Falls, Goodhue County, Minnesota. He graduated from high school and went to the Dunwoody College of Technology. He lived in Worthington, Minnesota with his wife and family and worked as an electrician for Worthington Electric Company. Judge served on the Minnesota State Board of Electricity from 1959 to 1969. He served in the Minnesota House of Representatives from 1969 to 1972 and was a Democrat. Judge died at Presbyterian Homes in Arden Hills, Minnesota.

References

1908 births
1994 deaths
People from Goodhue County, Minnesota
People from Worthington, Minnesota
Businesspeople from Minnesota
American electrical engineers
Democratic Party members of the Minnesota House of Representatives